This is a list of choux pastry dishes.  Choux pastry, or pâte à choux, is a light pastry dough that contains only butter, water, flour and eggs.  The high moisture content of the dough causes it to produce steam when cooked, which puffs the pastry.

Choux pastry dishes

See also

 List of baked goods

Pastries
Lists of foods by ingredient
Dessert-related lists
Choux pastry